Lawrence Gibb Knight (born 24 September 1949) is a former New Zealand rugby union player. A lock and loose forward, Knight represented Auckland and Poverty Bay at a provincial level, and was a member of the New Zealand national side, the All Blacks, from 1974 to 1977. He played 35 matches for the All Blacks including six internationals. 

Knight trained as a medical doctor. After completing his All Black career, he went to Paris to undertake further study and while there played rugby for the Paris Université Club. He later lived and worked in South Africa, practising medicine in Johannesburg, before returning to New Zealand in the late 1990s.

From 2010 to 2013, Knight served as president of the Auckland Rugby Union.

References

1949 births
Living people
Rugby union players from Auckland
People educated at Auckland Grammar School
University of Auckland alumni
New Zealand rugby union players
New Zealand international rugby union players
Auckland rugby union players
Poverty Bay rugby union players
Rugby union locks
Rugby union number eights
Rugby union flankers
21st-century New Zealand medical doctors
20th-century New Zealand medical doctors
New Zealand sports executives and administrators